Marion Frank Rudy (24 January 1925 – 13 December 2009) was the aeronautical engineer who patented a cushioning system based on an inert gas encapsulated in polyurethane plastic.  It was trademarked by Nike as the "Air" sole. He was a member of Case Western Reserve University's class of 1950, and a graduate of Fairview High School, in Fairview Park, Ohio.  He was also a member of the Phi Kappa Tau fraternity.

The 19 varsity athletic teams at his alma mater, Case Western Reserve Spartans, wear a special patch on their uniforms commemorating him and his invention.   The emblem has Rudy's initials, MFR, with a 3D design of special texture and shine to resemble inflated air sole look, and has orbiting planets pay tribute to his career as an aerospace engineer.

Rudy died in his home in California on December 13, 2009. He was 84 years old.

References

American aerospace engineers
Case Western Reserve University alumni
1925 births
2009 deaths
Nike, Inc. people
People from Fairview Park, Ohio
Engineers from Ohio
20th-century American engineers
20th-century American inventors